Maria Gabriela López Butron (9 November 1993) is a Mexican professional golfer.

Amateur career
López played college golf at the University of Arkansas where she won three events and was individual runner-up at the 2015 NCAA Division I Championship for the University of Arkansas.

Professional career
López began playing on the LPGA Tour in 2016 after finishing T-10 at 2015 qualifying school.

López qualified for the 2016 Summer Olympics and finished 31st.

On 10 November 2018, López won her first LPGA Tour event at the Blue Bay LPGA.

López placed 23rd at the women's Olympic golf tournament in Tokyo 2020.

Amateur wins
2010 Callaway Junior World (Girls 15–17), Mayakoba Junior Classic
2011 Campeonato Nacional Infantil/Juvenil
2012 Copa Yucatan Ladies, Campeonato Nacional Interzonas LII
2013 Westbrook Invitational
2014 Mexican Amateur, LSU Tiger Classic, Liz Murphey Collegiate Classic

Source:

Professional wins (3)

LPGA Tour wins (3)

LPGA Tour playoff record (1–0)

Results in LPGA majors
Results not in chronological order before 2019 or in 2020.

^ The Evian Championship was added as a major in 2013.

CUT = missed the half-way cut
NT = no tournament
"T" = tied

World ranking
Position in Women's World Golf Rankings at the end of each calendar year.

Team appearances
Espirito Santo Trophy (representing Mexico): 2010, 2014

References

External links

Mexican female golfers
LPGA Tour golfers
Olympic golfers of Mexico
Golfers at the 2016 Summer Olympics
Golfers at the 2020 Summer Olympics
Arkansas Razorbacks women's golfers
Schools of the Sacred Heart alumni
Sportspeople from Mexico City
1993 births
Living people